Maximilian Emil Hehl (born September 17, 1861, in Kassel – August 27, 1916 in São Paulo) was a German engineer and architect active in Brazil.

Son of Johannes Hehl, director of the Kassel Polytechnic College, and Carolin Wolff Hehl, he studied engineering in the Leibniz University Hannover. In 1888, he migrated to Brazil to work on railway construction in the state of Minas Gerais. He moved later to São Paulo where, in 1898, he became professor at the University of São Paulo Polytechnic School.

One of his early works was the Cathedral of St Peter in Bautzen, Germany.

His major work was the project for the new São Paulo Cathedral building, conceived in Neo-Gothic style. He died before the conclusion. He also designed the Cathedral of Santos as well as the Consolação Church in São Paulo, both in Neo-Gothic style.

References
Archdiocese of São Paulo (Portuguese)
São Paulo's City Hall (Portuguese)
NGO Viva o Centro (Portuguese)
Family information

1861 births
1916 deaths
19th-century German architects
Engineers from Kassel
Brazilian architects
Brazilian engineers
German emigrants to Brazil
Academic staff of the University of São Paulo
20th-century German architects